Aleksey Belevich (born 26 January 1995) is a Belarusian professional footballer who plays for Ostrovets.

Career
He made his professional debut in 2013, playing for FC Minsk against St Johnstone in UEFA Europa League match.

References

External links 
 
 

1995 births
Living people
People from Grodno
Belarusian footballers
Association football midfielders
FC Dinamo Minsk players
FC Minsk players
FC Bereza-2010 players
FC Torpedo-BelAZ Zhodino players
FC Granit Mikashevichi players
FC Baranovichi players
FC Chist players
FC Naftan Novopolotsk players
FC Ostrovets players